Colonel (Retd) Oli Ahmad, Bir Bikrom, is a Bangladeshi former minister & member of Parliament. He is a valiant freedom fighter and former Army officer. He is president of the Liberal Democratic Party of Bangladesh.

Biography
Ahmad was the first Bengali Military officer to revolt against the Pakistani army on 25 March 1971 before the start of the Bangladesh Liberation War. He was the first officer to be awarded the Bir Bikrom for his bravery during that war. He fought under Major Ziaur Rahman in Sector No. 1. Ahmad is highly regarded as one of the key founding members of the Bangladesh Nationalist Party (BNP). On 26 October 2006, Ahmad and several other senior leaders of the BNP defected to form the Liberal Democratic Party. At present he is serving as President of Liberal Democratic Party, #1 registered political party of Bangladesh. While performing as Chief Coordinator for 20 Party Alliance, Dr. Oli Ahmad launched a new movement called "Jatiya Mukti Mancha" on 27 June 2019.

Elections 

In 1996, there was 2 election (6th & 7th Parliament), Dr. Oli Ahmad was elected MP both times.
He was first elected from Chandanaish, in March 1980 by-election & was in the 2nd Parliament

Publications
Books published by Oli Ahmad include:
 Revolution, Military Personnel and the War of Liberation in Bangladesh. Dhaka: Dizzy Publications, 2004.
 Battles That I Fought and Interviews of Liberation War Heroes. Dhaka: Annesha Prokashon, 2009.

See also
 Bangladesh Liberal Democratic Party
 Bangladesh Nationalist Party
 Operation Searchlight
 Bir Bikrom

References

Further reading
 "Statesmen's Who's Who" – book published in 1992
 "Asia Pacific Who's Who" published in 2009 – Vol. IX from New Delhi, India

External links
 https://www.nytimes.com/1993/05/23/world/accord-will-allow-refugees-return-to-bangladesh.html, "Accord Will Allow Refugees' Return to Bangladesh"
 
 http://news.priyo.com/politics/2011/07/31/oli-ahmed-agrees-launching-uni-33238.html, "Oli Ahmed agrees on launching united anti-govt movement with Khaleda"
 http://www.banglanews24.com/English/detailsnews.php?nssl=32e8e6c03f3fa46eb672dc5680bff7da&nttl=2012012922743, "Col Oli Supports BNP's anti-government movement"
 http://www.bdinn.com/news/ugly-faces-of-ruling-party-oli-comes-under-attack/, "Ugly faces of ruling party, Oli comes under attack"
 http://www.banglanews24.com/English/detailsnews.php?nssl=93eb9cfb64391c4ee20ac49e72216fa4&nttl=2012092430942, "Col Oli gets bail in 2 cases"
 
http://archive.thedailystar.net/newDesign/news-details.php?nid=234543, "Off to Jail"
 
http://www.dr-oliahmad.com
 
http://ldp-bangladesh.com

Living people
1939 births
Road Transport and Bridges ministers of Bangladesh
Bangladeshi political party founders
Liberal Democratic Party (Bangladesh) politicians
Bangladesh Nationalist Party politicians
Recipients of the Bir Bikrom
People from Chittagong
8th Jatiya Sangsad members
2nd Jatiya Sangsad members
5th Jatiya Sangsad members
9th Jatiya Sangsad members
6th Jatiya Sangsad members
7th Jatiya Sangsad members
Mukti Bahini personnel